Víctor Marcelo Aguirre Benítez (born 21 January 1993) is a Paraguayan table tennis player who plays for Tischtennis-Bundesliga club Werder Bremen. He competed in the 2012 Summer Olympics.

Career
Aguirre was born in Asunción. He won the silver medal at the inaugural 2011 Latin American Cup held in Rio de Janeiro, Brazil after being defeated by Gustavo Tsuboi from Brazil, 4–0. he previously defeated Brazil's Cazuo Matsumoto 4–1 in the semi-finals.
He competed at the 2012 Summer Olympics in the Men's singles, but was defeated in the first round.

References

Paraguayan table tennis players
1993 births
Living people
Olympic table tennis players of Paraguay
Table tennis players at the 2008 Summer Olympics
Table tennis players at the 2012 Summer Olympics
Table tennis players at the 2016 Summer Olympics
Table tennis players at the 2015 Pan American Games
Pan American Games silver medalists for Paraguay
Pan American Games medalists in table tennis
Sportspeople from Asunción
South American Games silver medalists for Paraguay
South American Games bronze medalists for Paraguay
South American Games medalists in table tennis
Competitors at the 2018 South American Games
Table tennis players at the 2019 Pan American Games
Medalists at the 2015 Pan American Games
21st-century Paraguayan people